Venda Nova may refer to the following places:

Venda Nova (Amadora), a parish in the municipality of Amadora, Portugal
Venda Nova (Montalegre), a parish in the municipality of Montalegre, Portugal 
Venda Nova (Brazil) an administrative region of the city of Belo Horizonte in Brazil

See also
Vendas Novas, a parish and a municipality in the district of Évora, Portugal